Persea obtusifolia is a species of plant in the family Lauraceae. It is found in Costa Rica and Panama.

References

obtusifolia
Vulnerable plants
Taxonomy articles created by Polbot